The 1993–94 Ukrainian Hockey League season was the second season of the Ukrainian Hockey League, the top level of ice hockey in Ukraine. Six teams participated in the league, and ShVSM Kyiv won the championship.

First round

Final round

External links
1993-94 Standings and results. Ukrainian Ice Hockey Federation

UKHL
Ukrainian Hockey Championship seasons
Ukr